Milan Mladenović (21 September 1958 – 5 November 1994) was a Serbian and Yugoslavian musician best known as the frontman of the Yugoslav art rock band Ekatarina Velika.

Early life
Born to Serbian father Spasa from Kruševac and Croatian mother Danica from Makarska, Milan's first years were spent in Zagreb, PR Croatia, where his father, an officer in the Yugoslav People's Army, was stationed at the time. Consequently, Milan grew up wherever it was that his dad's job took the family. In total, it ended up being three cities.

When he was six, Milan's family moved to Sarajevo where he spent a notable part of his childhood.

Eventually in 1970, they moved to Belgrade just short of his 12th birthday. Once in Belgrade, Milan attended the Eleventh Belgrade Gymnasium in the Lekino Brdo neighbourhood while simultaneously entering the circle of young people involved with music and arts.

Musical career

Limunovo Drvo and Šarlo Akrobata
With schoolmate Gagi Mihajlović, Mladenović formed a band called Limunovo drvo (Lemon Tree) that dabbled in melodic hard rock. The group changed lineups frequently, displaying a pretty limited creative potential until the arrival of bassist Dušan Kojić Koja and drummer Ivan Vdović Vd. Soon afterwards, they adopted a new musical direction (new wave) and changed the name to Šarlo akrobata. During this time Milan was musically very much fond of and inspired by Elvis Costello, Paul Weller, and Andy Partridge of XTC.

Šarlo akrobata released only one album, Bistriji ili tuplji čovek biva kad... in July 1981 and broke up soon afterward due to creative differences between Milan and Koja. The record is considered to be one of the best and most important albums of the Yugoslav new wave music scene.

Katarina II and Ekatarina Velika

In late 1981 Milan and his former bandmate from Limunovo drvo Gagi Mihajlović (guitar) hooked up again to form Katarina II. In 1982 Margita Stefanović (keyboards), Bojan Pečar (bass) and Ivan Vdović Vd joined the band. After the self-titled, new wave coloured debut album, Vd and Gagi left the band. Since Gagi claimed ownership of the "Katarina II" name, the band was forced to take another one. They eventually settled on Ekatarina Velika and released a self-titled album in 1985. The album was widely critically acclaimed and brought them wider attention. Their next album S' vetrom uz lice launched them to the very top of the Yugoslav music scene, where they stayed for a long time, releasing a series of successful records. The concerts were jam packed and finally their music even made it on the state radio.

Final works
In 1992, Mladenović joined other Serbian musicians to form Rimtutituki project dedicated to the anti-war campaign. They released one single titled "Slušaj 'vamo". In the spring of 1994, Mladenović recorded and released an album called Angel's Breath in Brazil together with his old friend Suba (Mitar Subotić).

Death
In August 1994, Mladenović discovered that he had pancreatic cancer. He died on November 5 in Belgrade, FR Yugoslavia and was buried at Novo groblje cemetery (lot No. 114).

Legacy
Three streets in the capital cities of former Yugoslav republics bear Mladenović's name. A street in the Belgrade neighborhood Zemun Polje was named after him in 2004, a street in the Podgorica neighborhood Zabjelo in 2007, as well as a street in Zagreb (Croatia) in 2012.

Since 14 July 2011 the forecourt of the Belgrade Youth Center bears the name "Milan Mladenović Place".

Studio discography

With Šarlo Akrobata
Paket aranžman (1980) - with Električni orgazam and Idoli
Bistriji ili tuplji čovek biva kad... (1981)

With Katarina II/Ekatarina Velika
 Katarina II (1984)
 Ekatarina Velika (1985)
 S' vetrom uz lice (1986)
 Ljubav (1987)
 Samo par godina za nas (1989)
 Dum Dum (1991)
 Neko nas posmatra (1993)

With Angel's Breath
 Angel's Breath (1994)

References

External links

Ekatarina Velika On-Line - fansite  
A friend from Osijek 
Mladenović's grave at Belgrade Graveyards' website
Mladenović's grave at ''Finde a grave''' website
Danas 13 godina od smrti Milana Mladenovića, Blic, November 5, 2007
PRIČA O LIMUNOVOM DRVETU
PRIČA O LIMUNOVOM DRVETU II

1958 births
1994 deaths
Musicians from Zagreb
Serbian rock singers
20th-century Serbian male singers
Serbian rock guitarists
Lead guitarists
Yugoslav male singers
Musicians from Belgrade
Deaths from pancreatic cancer
Serbian punk rock musicians
Post-punk musicians
Serbian male poets
Serbian people of Croatian descent
Serbs of Croatia
Serbian record producers
Deaths from cancer in Serbia
20th-century Serbian poets
Burials at Belgrade New Cemetery
20th-century guitarists
Serbian anti-war activists
Musicians from Sarajevo
Yugoslav rock singers